Conor Patton, better known by his stage name Conro, is a Canadian DJ and record producer, based in Kelowna, British Columbia. He is best known for his song "Therapy" with over 21 million streams on Spotify and as an artist of the Canadian record label Monstercat.

Early life
Conro became interested in music production at a young age, as he took up piano, guitar, and the drums. He started playing the violins at the age of seven and later, joined rock n' roll and alternative bands. He lived in a trailer and worked as a security guard prior to his musical career.

Career

2012–2016
In 2012, his debut song "Axiom" was released through the record label Kindergarten. The song was part of a two-track EP of the same title. His 2015 collaboration titled "Bittersweet" with Dyro and vocalist Envy Monroe, which was released through Hardwell's Revealed Recordings, became one of his most successful songs. In 2016, he released on Canadian record label Monstercat the singles "On My Way Up", "I Wanna Know " and "City Lights", the latter of which features vocalist Royal. "On My Way Up" has received over 3.3 million Spotify streams as of July 2017. He also released a single titled "The Saint" on Monstercat.

2017–present
In March 2017, Conro released the single "Chardonnay" which features vocalist Karra. He also remixed the Martin Garrix song "Scared to Be Lonely".

On May 17, 2017, he released a single titled "Lay Low" on Monstercat. The song features vocalist David Benjamin, who met Conro at the Amsterdam Dance Event in 2016. Conro released a single titled "Close", which would be included as the second single in his debut EP, in July 2017.

On August 9, 2017, Conro released his debut EP titled Connecting the Dots, featuring 5 songs. On August 25, 2017, Conro collaborated with fellow future bass producers Anevo and Grant to release a single titled "Without You" on the Canadian record label Monstercat. The song, which features vocals by Victoria Zaro, was included on the Monstercat compilation album Monstercat Uncaged Vol. 2 alongside three songs from Conro's debut EP.

On June 30, 2017, he released on Martin Garrix's label Stmpd Rcrds, the song titled "Like You Love Me" as a collaboration with producer Disero and vocalist Alice France.

In the December 9 week for the Billboard Dance/Mix Show Airplay chart, Conro's song "Close" peaked at 31st.

Discography

Albums

Extended plays

Charted singles

Other singles

As lead artist

As featured artist

Remixes
2014
Popeska featuring Denny White – "Heart Of Glass" (Conro Remix)

2016
Paris Blohm featuring Blondfire – "Something About You" (Conro Ultra Miami 2016 Remix)
Fais featuring Afrojack – "Hey" (Conro Remix)
Mr. Probz – "Fine Ass Mess" (Conro Remix)
Justin Bieber – "As Long as You Love Me" (Conro Remix)

2017
Martin Garrix and Dua Lipa – "Scared to Be Lonely" (Conro Remix)
Martin Solveig – "Places" (Conro Remix)
Youngr – Monsters (Conro Remix)
Louis the Child featuring Elohim - "Love Is Alive" (Conro Remix)

Covers
2018
Earth, Wind & Fire – "September"

2020 

 Des'ree – You Gotta Be (with Lissa)

References

Monstercat artists
Future bass musicians
Armada Music artists
Canadian DJs
Canadian electronic musicians
Living people
Musicians from Kelowna
Musicians from Saskatchewan
Revealed Recordings artists
Stmpd Rcrds artists
Electronic dance music DJs
Year of birth missing (living people)